Ernst Düllberg (28 March 1913 – 27 July 1984)   
was a former German Luftwaffe fighter ace and recipient of the Knight's Cross of the Iron Cross during World War II. Ernst Düllberg was credited with 45 victories in 650 combat missions, 36 over Western Front and 9 victories over the Eastern Front.

On 22 November 1941, Düllberg was wounded in aerial combat south of Sidi Rezegh resulting in a forced landing in his Messerschmitt Bf 109 F-4 trop (Werknummer 8466—factory number). After the war it was established that Düllberg was shot down by Alan Rawlinson.

Awards
 Iron Cross (1939) 2nd and 1st Class
 German Cross in Gold on 16 January 1944 as Major in the III./Jagdgeschwader 27
 Knight's Cross of the Iron Cross on 27 July 1944 as Major and Gruppenkommandeur of the III./Jagdgeschwader 27

References

Citations

Bibliography

External links

   
   

1913 births
1984 deaths
Luftwaffe pilots
German World War II flying aces
People from Unna
Recipients of the Gold German Cross
Recipients of the Knight's Cross of the Iron Cross
People from the Province of Westphalia
Military personnel from North Rhine-Westphalia